American rapper Lil Debbie has released one compilation album, four extended plays (EPs), two mixtapes, seventeen singles (including four as a featured artist and two promotional singles) and nineteen music videos.

In 2011, Debbie was a member of the White Girl Mob, a group consisting of herself and fellow rappers Kreayshawn and V-Nasty. Following an appearance in the music video for Kreayshawn's "Gucci Gucci", Debbie released a series of music videos alongside fellow rappers Riff Raff, V-Nasty and DollaBillGates. These songs later saw commercial release as singles, eventually being compiled on to a mixtape titled Keep It Lit, and became Debbie's first releases as a musician. Two years later, Debbie released her first commercial project, an EP titled Queen D. The EP featured three original tracks, all of which were accompanied by music videos, and two remixes. Due to its short length, Queen D was not eligible to chart on any album charts in the United States. However, it charted at 19 on the US Billboard Singles Sales Chart, and 4 on the US Billboard R&B/Hip-Hop Singles Sales Chart.

In 2014, Debbie released her second EP, California Sweetheart, Pt. 1. The EP charted at 22 on the US Billboard Heatseekers Albums Chart. In August, a follow-up EP, California Sweetheart, Pt. 2 was released, but failed to attain the commercial success of its predecessor. In October of that year, a compilation of the two California Sweetheart EPs was released. The following month, Debbie's second mixtape, Young B!tch, was released. In June 2015, Debbie released the single "Lofty", which appeared on the Colt 45 mixtape Colt 15. Debbie released her fourth EP, titled Home Grown, in July. The EP featured guest appearances from Wiz Khalifa, Paul Wall and Bricc Baby Shitro.

In the midst of the 2020 COVID-19 pandemic, Capozzi got invited to open for NightBass and AC Slater (under her own name CAPOZZI). This was once of her first public performances for NightBass Records through their Twitch live stream.

Albums

Studio albums

Compilation albums

EPs

Mixtapes

Singles

As lead artist

As featured artist

Promotional singles

Guest appearances

Music videos

As lead artist

As featured artist

References

Discographies of American artists
Hip hop discographies